Samudrala (Telugu: సముద్రాల) is an Indian surname and may refer to:
 
 Samudrala Sr. (1902–1968), writer, producer, and director
 Samudrala Jr. (1923–1985), film writer and son of Samudrala Sr.
 Samudrala Venugopal Chary (fl. 1985–2009), Indian politician
 Ram Samudrala (born 1972), American professor of Bioinformatics

Indian surnames